Abstinence is an American experimental industrial music project founded in 1985 in Belmar, New Jersey, and now based in Brooklyn, New York. Their sound ranges from bombastic to noise, ambient soundtrack to industrial music and uses video/audio dialog and sound samples.

Discography

Full length albums and EPs 
Revolt of the Cyberchrist (1994, Furnace Records/Silent Records) – #18 CMJ RPM Charts
Theorem (1995, Furnace/Silent)
The Path of Maximum Resistance (2005, s6k media)
Delusions of Architecture (2014, Furnace Records/Voidstar Productions)

Singles 
Frigid 12" EP (1994, Furnace/Silent)

Compilation appearances 
Hellscape (1995, Furnace/Silent) includes the songs "Interference" and "Screaming Into the Void VSmix: (Virtually Silent Mix)"
New Industries (1995, Dynamica Records – Germany) includes the song "Frigid Changes"
Hellscape 2 (1995, Furnace/Silent) includes the song "Fractured/Assassinate the Beat"
Operation:Beatbox (1996, Reconstriction Records/Cargo Records) includes the song "Two-Three-Break"
Ikebana: Merzbow's Amlux Rebuilt, Reused And Recycled (2003, Important Records) includes the song "Freq"
The Unreasonable: Voidstar Productions XXV Year Anniversary Compilation (2015, Voidstar Productions) includes the song "Multiple Beat Revolt (MSTREdit)"

Filmography 
Backyard Glances soundtrack Alva Skateboards (1987) includes the song "Level 7"
Multiple Cross Wounds unreleased video (1991)

Members

Current 
 Darryl Hell (1985–present)
 John Bechdel (1993–1996, 2004–present)
 Deftly-D (2004–present)
Brian 'Beat' Senders (2009–present)

Past members 

 Steve Herring
 Bill Kuegler
 Mike Roberts
 Eloise Mourning
 Paul Raven
 J. Burns
 Jerry Franklin
 Bill Latshaw
 Tommy Latshaw
 Tommy Walling
 Mark Yard
 Mike Scrivani
 Greg Hunt
 Terry Hughes

Related bands 
Operation Mindwipe
 Rock'it Society
 Patient 4311
 Nau-Zee-auN
 Zero Times Infinity
 Terrorfakt
Mon -O- Taur
Machine Age Madness
MMOS
Digital Disturbance

References

External links 
s6k.com Aartivist site run by Darryl Hell (archived)
Voidstar Productions
Furnace Records on discogs.com

American industrial music groups
Musical groups established in 1985
Musical groups from New Jersey
Belmar, New Jersey
1985 establishments in New Jersey